Independence Airport , also known as Savannah Airport or Mango Creek Airport, is an airport serving Independence and Mango Creek, a coastal community straddling the border between Toledo and Stann Creek Districts in Belize.

Airlines and destinations

See also

Transport in Belize
List of airports in Belize

References

External links 
OpenStreetMap - Independence
 Airport record for Independence Airport at Landings.com

Aerodromes in Belize - pdf

Airports in Belize
Toledo District